Lutocin  is a village in Żuromin County, Masovian Voivodeship, in east-central Poland. It is the seat of the gmina (administrative district) called Gmina Lutocin.

The village has a population of 1,000.

References

Villages in Żuromin County